Maurits Maarten Alexander Jonkman (born 20 March 1986), is a Dutch international cricketer who has represented the Netherlands in first-class and One-Day International cricket. He is a right-arm fast bowler.

His identical twin, Mark, also represents the Netherlands in cricket.

References

External links

1986 births
Living people
Dutch cricketers
Netherlands One Day International cricketers
Sportspeople from The Hague
Dutch twins
Identical twins
Twin sportspeople